Scandinavian Weekend Radio (SWR) is a shortwave and medium wave radio station in Virrat, Finland, established in 2000. It broadcasts for 24 hours on the first Saturday of every month and on Christmas Day. It is the only shortwave and medium wave radio station in Finland.

The station is run by volunteers of which many are amateur radio operators, DXers and former pirate radio operators. Funding comes from membership fees of the voluntary association and PR product sales. Even though SWR is a commercial station, there are just a few advertisers.

References

External links
 http://www.swradio.net

Shortwave radio stations
Radio stations established in 2000
Radio stations in Finland